Indian was launched at Workington in 1820. She traded widely, and between 1828 an 1831 or so made several voyages to Singapore, Batavia, and Manila under a license from the British East India Company (EIC). She was wrecked around 1843.

Career
Indian first appeared in Lloyd's Register (LR) in 1820.

In 1813 the EIC had lost its monopoly on the trade between India and Britain. British ships were then free to sail to India or the Indian Ocean under a license from the EIC.

On 27 July 1828 Captain Eadie sailed for Batavia and Singapore under a license from the EIC. Then on 31 October 1829 Captain Harding sailed there too. On 15 August 1831 Captain W. Ravenscroft sailed Indian to Batavia and Manilla.

Fate
Her entry in the 1843 volume of LR has the annotation "Wrecked" by her name.

Citations and references
Citations

References
 

1820 ships
Ships built in England
Age of Sail merchant ships of England
Maritime incidents in 1843